Parrhasius is a Nearctic and Neotropical genus of butterflies in the family Lycaenidae.

Species
Parrhasius m-album (Boisduval & Le Conte, 1833)
Parrhasius moctezuma (Clench, 1971)
Parrhasius orgia (Hewitson, 1867)
Parrhasius polibetes (Stoll, [1781])
Parrhasius selika (Hewitson, 1874)
Parrhasius urraca Nicolay, 1979

References

Eumaeini
Lycaenidae of South America
Insects of the Arctic
Lycaenidae genera
Taxa named by Jacob Hübner